William the Norman (died 1075) was a medieval Bishop of London.

William was consecrated in 1051. He, along with Ralf the Staller and a royal priest, supervised the submission of the English in East Anglia soon after the Norman Conquest in 1066. He attended the Council of London in 1075. He died in 1075.

Citations

References
 
 
 

Bishops of London
Anglo-Normans
1075 deaths
11th-century English Roman Catholic bishops
Year of birth unknown